Whitecairns is a village in the Formartine area of Aberdeenshire, Scotland, lying  north of Potterton and  south of Pitmedden on the B999 road.

Transport
Regular bus services link Whitecairns with Potterton and Aberdeen to the south, and with Pitmedden and Tarves to the north.

Decoy airfield
During the Second World War, Harestone Moss, close to Whitecairns was set up as a decoy site for RAF Dyce airfield.  This was to trick the Luftwaffe into thinking that this was Dyce airfield at night.  

The decoy was bombed on several occasions, two craters are still present today.

3 Aug 1940
3 Nov 1940
5 Dec 1940
18 July 1941

This decoy site had a bunker that housed a generator used to power the dummy airfield lights.

References 

Villages in Aberdeenshire